This is a list of cricketers who represented their country at the 1987 Cricket World Cup in India and Pakistan which took place from 9 October 1987 to 8 November 1987. The oldest player at the 1987 Cricket World Cup was John Traicos (40) of Zimbabwe while the youngest player was Ijaz Ahmed (19) of Pakistan.

Australia
Coach:  Bob Simpson

England
Coach:  Micky Stewart

India
Manager:  PR Man Singh

New Zealand

Pakistan

Sri Lanka

West Indies

Zimbabwe

See also
1987 Cricket World Cup Final

External links
 1987 Cricket World Cup. Cricinfo.com.

Cricket World Cup squads
1987 Cricket World Cup